Jean Pierre Rouanet (28 March 1894 – 21 July 1979) was a sailor from France, who represented his country at the 1928 Summer Olympics in Amsterdam, Netherlands.

References

Sources

External links
 

Sailors at the 1928 Summer Olympics – 6 Metre
Olympic sailors of France
French male sailors (sport)
1979 deaths
1894 births